Magia is a 2002 album by the Dominican rock band Toque Profundo and their fourth. The album was independently released and funded by the band. Toque Profundo produced a rock re-make of Tabaco Y Ron popularized in Merengue by Fernando Villalona and written by Roldofo Aicardi originally to be released in compilation album Rockero Hasta La Tambora

Track listing
 Cero
 Arranka
 Tabaco y Ron
 Ángel Ciego
 No Iré
 ? (Acertijo)
 Paradisso
 Downtown Express
 Monte Plata Beach Resort
 Paredes del Silencio
 El Cristo del Retrovisor
 El Viaje
 Jaque ft. Ana Feliz
 Soda y Café
 El Hombre de la Armadura
 Millones de Voces
 La Mano Fuerte ft. Pablo Cavallo

2002 albums
Toque Profundo albums